This is a list of some well-known Miao/Hmong individuals throughout the world. The Hmong are an Asian ethnic group from the mountainous regions of China, Vietnam, Laos, and Thailand. Hmong are also one of the sub-groups of the Miao ethnicity in southern China.

List
Ahney Her, actress, best known as Sue Lor in Gran Torino
April Yang, YouTube star with over 2 million subscribers
 Bee Vang, actor, best known as Thao Vang Lor in Gran Torino
 Brenda Song, Disney channel actress/teen star, known for The Suite Life of Zack & Cody and The Suite Life on Deck; Song is an anglicized spelling of "Xiong"
 Blong Xiong, first Asian American and Hmong American to serve on the Fresno City Council (2006)
Cao Lu, idol singer of Korean group Fiestar
Chen Zi You, 陈子由, Miao model and actor
Cherzong Vang, St. Paul Community Leader; Lao and Hmong veterans' leader, Lao Veterans of America
 Chai Vang, ex-National Guardsman; convicted multiple murderer
 Chervang Kong Vang, Reverend; a Hmong minister who established United Christians Liberty Evangelical Church, the first Hmong independent church organization, and also the creator of the Nyiakeng Puachue Hmong script.
 Cy Thao, Minnesota State Representative
 Dia Cha, author, former professor and anthropologist, St. Cloud State University, Minnesota
Doua Moua, actor, known for Gran Torino and Disney's Mulan.
 Doualy Xaykaothao, freelance American journalist and radio producer known for her work with NPR
Fei Yang, YouTube star with over 1 million subscribers. Her channel is called, heyitsfeiii.
 Foung Hawj (侯祝福 | ຝົງ ເຮີ), pioneer Hmong-American broadcaster; media artist; Minnesota State Senator elected in 2012
 Fres Thao, hip hop and spoken word artist
 Lieutenant Colonel Hang Sao
 Houa Vue Moua, author and community activist
 Xao "Jerry" Yang, 2007 World Series of Poker Main Event Champion and currently owner of several sushi-inspired restaurants in Las Vegas and California.
 Joe Bee Xiong, first Hmong American elected to public office in the state of Wisconsin, serving two terms as Eau Claire City councilman
 Ka Vang, writer
 Kao Kalia Yang, Hmong American writer; author of The Latehomecomer: A Hmong Family Memoir; her work has appeared in the Paj Ntaub Voice Hmong Literary Journal and numerous other publications
 Kazoua Kong-Thao, first Hmong American to serve on the Saint Paul School Board of Education
 Laolee Xiong, founder of The Vocal Network a cappella group and Techapella singing showcase
 Lán yè zhēn (蓝业珍) or Lan Ni (蓝妮) - from July 2, 1912 - September 28, 1996 - is a princess. Her grandfather is Lan Heguang (蓝和光), a Miao king in Yunnan Jianshui. Lan Ni was born in Macau, China.
Lei Ahyouduo, ethnic Miao Chinese singer
 Lia Lee, subject of the 1997 book The Spirit Catches You and You Fall Down
 Long Qingquan, 龙清泉, Miao Olympian; won a gold medal in Men's 56 kg weightlifting for China in the 2008 Beijing Olympics
Leekong Xiong, famous singer from Laos
 Lormong Lo, former Omaha City Councilman
 Luo Zheng, 罗正, Miao singer, actor, and former member of the Chinese project boy group MR-X
 Luj Yaj, singer from Thailand
 Mai Neng Moua, writer
 Mai Vang, first Hmong woman elected to the Sacramento City Council
 Mee Moua, Minnesota State Senator
 Megan Khang, first Hmong professional golfer, started playing golf at 5 1/2 yrs old, from Massachusetts
 Nattaphone Suepsakwong (Keng Yang), the first Hmong person to be elected into the Royal Thai Parliament. He was also an actor. 
 Noah Lor, first Hmong American to be elected Mayor Pro-Tempore in the City of Merced's history; elected as city councilman in Merced in 2007 and re-elected again in 2011
 Pa Chay Vue, a leading member of the Madman's War, a rebellion against the French colonialism in Southeast Asia, especially in Vietnam. 
 Pa Kao Her, after the Secret War in Laos, Her fled to Thailand and organized a political movement to take back the country of Laos. 
 Pany Yathotou, the first Hmong woman to become the vice president of Laos and is currently serving alongside Bounthong Chitmany. She was the chairwoman and governor of the Bank of the Lao P.D.R from 1988-1997. She was also the President of the National Assembly of Laos from 2010-2021. 
 Payengxa Lor, the first Hmong woman to compete in Miss Universe 2022, representing Laos. 
 Qin Liangyu, 秦良玉, Miao Chinese General of the Ming Dynasty; highest ranking female general of Chinese history
 Sandy'Ci Moua, Hmong American actress; community organizer; production assistant and consultant
 Shen Congwen, 沈从文, Miao Chinese writer from the May Fourth Movement
 Sheng Thao, First Hmong Woman to serve on the Oakland City Council 
 SomXai Vue First Hmong American served in the Thornton City Council in Colorado.
 Song Zuying, 宋祖英, ethnic Miao Chinese singer
 Song Jia Ling, 宋佳玲, Miao actor and sister of Song Zuying
 Steve Ly, First Mayor in the United States of America of Hmong descent - Mayor of Elk Grove, California
 Sunisa Lee, artistic gymnast, first Hmong-American to qualify for the US Olympic Team and 2020/2021 all-around Olympic gold medalist
 Dr. Tony Vang, first Hmong elected as a member of the Fresno Unified school board in Fresno, California
 Tou Ger Xiong, diversity consultant, comedian, storyteller, and rapper
 Touby Lyfoung, Hmong politician in Laos, served in several ministries in the Royal Lao Government, and key adviser to the King. After the war, Lyfoung was captured and tortured to death by the Communist Pathet Lao.
 Trinity Vang, Hmong-American storyteller and digital creator. Founder of TRIN Collective which was featured at Urban Outfitters. First Hmong-American woman to be presented the Inna Meiman Human Rights award by the University of Minnesota- Twin Cities.
 Vang Pao, Royal Lao Army Major General; revered Hmong Leader; commander of CIA-supported Hmong forces during the Laotian Civil War
Vang Pobzeb, PhD. Laos and Hmong Scholar; founder and past President of Lao Human Rights Council, Inc.
Vu Pa Chay (Hmong: Vwj Paj Cai, Hmong Vietnamese: Vux Pax Chai, a Hmong leader who revolted against the French imperialist in northern Vietnam and Laos
Vuong Chinh Duc (1865 - 1947) ( RPA : Vaj Tsoov Loom ) was a H'Mong king ( also known as King Meo ) with his kingdom in Dong Van district, Ha Giang province, Vietnam
 Wang Zhiming, Miao pastor; memorialized above the Great West Door of Westminster Abbey
Wangyee Vang, President of Lao Veterans of America Institute; Lao and Hmong community veterans' leader
 Xiong Chaozhong, Xiong Zhong Zhao, 熊朝忠, Miao (Hmong) light flyweight boxer of Wenshan, China
 Yasmi Pajyi Yang, Hmong international singer, songwriter, actress, model, entrepreneur
 Yang Xi Zi, 杨肸子, Miao actress and singer, starred in Love and Redemption and Immortal Samsara
 Yia Moua, known as the Bull, former Muay Thai kickboxing champion, deceased
 Zong Zoua Her, a Hmong anti-Pathet Lao and leader of a resistant group in Laos.
 Zou Shiming, 邹市明, the most successful amateur boxer from the People's Republic of China; won two world titles in 2005 and 2007 and the gold medal at the 2008 Summer Olympics in the light flyweight (-48 kg) division
 Zoua Vang, first Hmong-American mainstream television journalist

References